Rhéal Éloi Fortin  is a Canadian lawyer and politician, who is the member of the House of Commons for Rivière-du-Nord.

A lawyer by profession, he is the president of Bissonnette Fortin Giroux, a law firm in Saint-Jérôme. He studied law at University of Sherbrooke. He was elected to the House of Commons of Canada in the 2015 election in Rivière-du-Nord as a member of the Bloc Québécois,

Fortin was named interim leader of the Bloc Québécois on October 22, 2015 following the resignation of Gilles Duceppe as leader after Duceppe was unable to win his seat in the election.

He served as interim leader of the party until the next leader, Martine Ouellet was named on March 18, 2017.

Fortin and six other Bloc MPs resigned from the Bloc's caucus to sit as an independent MP on February 28, 2018 citing conflicts with Ouellet's leadership. Fortin then served as leader of the party formed by the dissidents, Québec debout. He rejoined the Bloc Québécois caucus on September 17, 2018.

Biography
Fortin was born in Laval-des-Rapides, Quebec. He started working when he was 18. He completed a CEGEP electrician's diploma, equivalent to junior college. He was a worker in a factory in Laval from 1977 to 1985, then left to attend university to study law. After completing his legal education, he began practising law in Saint-Jérôme in 1992.

Political career
He has been politically active ever since high school, when he volunteered to put up lawn signs for the Parti Québécois. He ran for the Parti Québécois nomination for the election for the National Assembly of Quebec for Prévost, but lost to Gilles Robert. In 2015 he ran for the Bloc Québécois in the riding Rivière-du-Nord and won. He became the interim leader of Bloc Québécois on October 22, 2015. On December 7, 2016, he announced that he would not be seeking the permanent leadership of the party at its leadership election in 2017.

He served as the BQ's critic for intergovernmental affairs, human rights, justice, and access to information in the House of Commons until February 2018, when he and six other Bloc MPs quit the caucus and formed the Groupe parlementaire québécois in protest of Martine Ouellet's leadership style. Fortin was named the group's spokesperson on March 21, 2018.

Electoral record

References

External links

Living people
Members of the House of Commons of Canada from Quebec
Bloc Québécois leaders
Bloc Québécois MPs
Lawyers in Quebec
People from Saint-Jérôme
Politicians from Laval, Quebec
Université de Sherbrooke alumni
21st-century Canadian politicians
Québec debout MPs
Leaders of political parties in Canada
Year of birth missing (living people)